The Vermont Community Newspaper Group is a media company and publisher of five weekly newspapers and multiple magazines in the U.S. state of Vermont.

History 
After owning the Stowe Reporter for 17 years, publisher Biddle Duke sold a majority stake in December 2014 to Bob Miller of New York and Norb Garret of California. Greg Popa replaced Duke as publisher. On Oct. 1, 2015, the Stowe Reporter bought the Morrisville News and Citizen.  In May 2017, they bought the Shelburne News, a weekly covering Shelburne, Vermont, and The Citizen, a weekly covering the towns of Charlotte and Hinesburg, Vermont.

In January 2019, the company had grown to include six weekly community newspapers and changed its name to the Vermont Community Newspaper Group. 

On March 26, 2020, the company announced that the Waterbury Record was suspending publication after 13 years.

In July 2020, the company laid off three of its nine editorial employees, including Tom Kearney who had served as managing editor. Additional positions were also eliminated.

Newspapers 
The Vermont Community Newspaper Group publishes five weekly newspapers:

 Stowe Reporter, covering the Stowe area since 1958
 The News and Citizen, covering the Morrisville area since 1881
 The Citizen, covering Charlotte and Hinesburg since 2006
 Shelburne News, covering Shelburne since 1967
 The Other Paper, covering South Burlington since 1977

All five newspapers operate websites with updated news throughout the week.

From 2007 until March 2020, the group also published the Waterbury Record.

Magazines 
The company publishes multiple magazines:

 Stowe Guide and Magazine, twice-yearly
 Stowe Weddings
 Green Mountain Weddings
 Table

References 

Newspapers published in Vermont
Weekly newspapers published in the United States